Rozanov is a Russian masculine surname; its feminine counterpart is Rozanova. It may refer to:
Irina Rozanova (born 1961), Russian actress
Maria Rozanova (born 1929), Russian publisher and editor
Olga Rozanova (1886–1918), Russian avant-garde artist
Sergei Rozanov (1870–1937), Russian clarinetist 
Vasily Rozanov (1856–1919), Russian writer and philosopher

See also
Ryazanov

Russian-language surnames